"Experimental Film" is a song by alternative rock band They Might Be Giants. It is the lead single from their 2004 album The Spine. The song has been seen by some critics as a return to the band's earlier sound. An animated music video was made for the song by internet animators The Brothers Chaps and featured characters from the animators' internet series Homestar Runner.

Though it saw no domestic release, "Experimental Film" was released promotionally in Great Britain. The disc included "Am I Awake?" and "Memo to Human Resources" as well as the single. The song was also released on a one-track promotional disc in Australia.

Subject matter 
The song's lyrics are a satire of avant-garde cinema, and its perceived tendency toward meaninglessness and pomposity. The "narrator" of the song is an enthusiastic filmmaker who is attempting to make the eponymous movie. He extols its greatness, and makes grandiose statements about his abundance of ideas and his intention to make the viewer's "face implode" in the end, but the film is unfinished and lacks a discernible subject.

Homestar Runner video 
The video itself is a cartoon experimental film and is ostensibly directed by Homestar Runner cartoon characters Strong Sad and The Cheat. Their individual contributions are wildly different: Strong Sad's footage looks like it has been shot on black-and-white film, while The Cheat's portions are animated in his distinctively simplistic style. Initially the video simply cuts between the two, but as the video progresses, they are superimposed and mixed together more and more until the two become indistinguishable. Strong Sad's footage also includes other characters walking onto the set, and he is shown chasing them off of the set and berating them. The video is full of references to other experimental films.

In spite of They Might Be Giants originally planning to make a separate video for the "MTV crowd", they have declared the Homestar Runner video to be the song's official music video.

Translation
The song has been translated into French on the Homestar Runner Wiki.

References

External links
 Experimental Film (song) at This Might Be A Wiki
 Experimental Film (releases) at This Might Be A Wiki
 Experimental Film music video at Homestar Runner
 Experimental Film at Homestar Runner Wiki

They Might Be Giants songs
2004 songs
Songs written by John Linnell
Songs written by John Flansburgh
Experimental film
Animated music videos